Manhaton Records is a British independent record label which was formed in 1999. It was started by musician Eric Bibb and  his then manager, Alan Robinson, who had previously run Code Blue Records for Warner Music along with Mike Vernon and Tony Engle.

Apart from Eric Bibb, the label's roster has included Robin Trower, Aynsley Lister, King King, Ben Poole, Sari Schorr, and Stevie Nimmo.

UK chart successes for the label have included King King's Exile and Grace (number 31 in the UK Albums Chart), Eric Bibb's Home To Me (number 19 in the Jazz & Blues chart) and Robin Trower's Something's About To Change (number 3 in the Jazz & Blues chart).

References

External links

British independent record labels